Rudolf Kraus (31 October 1868, Jungbunzlau – 15 July 1932) was an Austrian pathologist, bacteriologist and immunologist known for his work with bacterial precipitins.

In 1893 he obtained his doctorate at the University of Prague. Following studies at the Pasteur Institute in Paris, he settled in Vienna in 1895 as an assistant to Richard Paltauf (1858-1924) at the serotherapeutic institute. In 1901 he became a privat-docent for general and experimental pathology, followed by a promotion as associate professor in 1906. In 1908 he traveled to St. Petersburg, where he conducted investigations of an epidemic of cholera.

Shortly before the outbreak of World War I, he moved to South America. In 1921 he was appointed director of the institute of bacteriology in Buenos Aires, and after a period of time in Sao Paulo, he returned to Vienna in 1924 as head of the serotherapeutic institute. In 1929 he was named director of the Istituto bacteriologico de Chile in Santiago.

With August Paul von Wassermann (1866-1925), he was co-founder of the Free Association for Microbiology.

Selected writings 
 
 Handbuch der Technik und Methodik der Immunitätsforschung (with Constantin Levaditi), 1908-09 - Handbook of technology and methodology for immunization research.
 Handbuch der Immunitätsforschung und experimentellen Therapie, mit besonderer Berücksichtigung der Technik und Methodik, 1914 - Handbook of immunization research and experimental therapy, etc.
 Die Cholera asiatica und die Cholera nostras, 1914 - Cholera Asiatica and cholera nostras.
 Handbuch der mikrobiologischen Technik, (with Paul Uhlenhuth), 1923-24 - Handbook of microbiological techniques.
 10 jahre Südamerika; vorträge über epidemiologie und infektionskrankheiten der menschen und tiere, 1927 - Ten years in South America, Lessons on epidemiology and infectious diseases of humans and animals.
 Giftschlangen und die Serumbehandlung der Schlangenbisse, 1931 - Poisonous snakes and serum treatment for snake bites.

References 

Austrian bacteriologists
Austrian immunologists
Austrian pathologists
1932 deaths
1868 births
People from Mladá Boleslav
Academic staff of the University of Vienna
Burials at Feuerhalle Simmering